The Jardim Botânico de Curitiba, in Portuguese, or the Botanical Garden of Curitiba, in English, also known as the "Jardim Botânico Fanchette Rischbieter", is a park located in the city of Curitiba - the capital of the state of Paraná, and the biggest city in southern Brazil. It is the major tourist attraction and landmark of the city, and it houses part of the campus of the Federal University of Paraná. The international identification code is CURIT.

Opened in 1991, Curitiba's trademark botanical garden was created in the style of French gardens. Once by the portal of entry, one may see extensive gardens in the French style amidst fountains, waterfalls and lakes, and the main greenhouse of 458 square meters, which shelters in its interior, specimens of plants characteristic of tropical regions. It rolls out its carpet of flowers to the visitors right at the entrance. The park occupies 240.000 m² in area. The principal greenhouse, in an art nouveau style with a modern metallic structure, resembles the mid-19th century Crystal Palace in London.  The Botanic Museum, which provides a national reference collection of native flora, attracts researchers from all over the world. It includes many botanic species from the moist Atlantic Forests of eastern Brazil.

The native forest is filled with paths for strolling. Behind the greenhouse is the Museum of Franz Krajcberg , the Polish Brazilian artist who took up the cause of Environmental protection; with 1,320 square meters of area, divided into multimedia classrooms, an auditorium with 60 seats and lounge with several exhibitions of works donated by visual artists, represented by sculptures and reliefs, as well as photographs, videos, publications and educational materials.
 
In the other side of the park is the Botanical Museum, a wooden building whose main entrance is reached through a wooden bridge. The Botanical Museum of Curitiba has the fourth largest herbarium in the country.  In front of the construction there is a pond with carp, turtles, herons, etc., and around the building there is a lake, an auditorium, a library, an expositions area, a theatre, tennis courts and a cycle track.

Album

References

External links
 Official Page
 Information Page

Parks in Curitiba
Botanical gardens in Brazil